Franz Eckhardt (6 August 1927 – 5 October 2011) was an Austrian bobsledder who competed in the early 1950s. At the 1952 Winter Olympics, he finished fifth in the four-man event and ninth in the two-man event.

References
1952 bobsleigh two-man results
1952 bobsleigh four-man results

External links
 

1927 births
2011 deaths
Austrian male bobsledders
Olympic bobsledders of Austria
Bobsledders at the 1952 Winter Olympics